Ivan Ivanovich Dubasov (30 November 1897, Odintsovo, Moscow Governorate, Russian Empire – 15 March 1988, Moscow, Russian SFSR, USSR) was a Russian artist active in the Soviet Union. He was the head artist of the Goznak from 1932 to 1971 and was made an Honored Artist of the RSFSR in 1959.

He developed sketches and designs for multiple Soviet banknotes, stamps, orders, medals, awards and decorations over several decades. During 1943-1945 Goznak was entrusted with a number of important tasks to create banknotes, not only for the USSR, but also for the new socialist countries that appeared after the end of the war. In the GDR, Mongolia, Poland, China, Czechoslovakia, Albania for dozens of years the money, sketches for which were made by Ivan Dubasov, were used.

Ivan Dubasov was awarded the Order of Lenin (1945), the Order of the Red Banner of Labour (1951), the Order of the Badge of Honour and a number of other medals and decorations.

References 

1897 births
1988 deaths
20th-century engravers
People from Odintsovo
Honored Artists of the RSFSR
Soviet painters
Russian engravers
Russian stamp designers
Postage stamps of the Soviet Union
Recipients of the Order of Lenin
20th-century Russian painters
Russian male painters
20th-century Russian male artists